LGA 4189 is an Intel microprocessor compatible socket, used by Cooper Lake and Ice Lake-SP microprocessors.

Two incompatible versions exist: Socket P5 for Cedar Island platform and Cooper Lake, and Socket P4 for Whitley platform and Ice Lake-SP.

References 

Intel CPU sockets